Events in the year 1952 in Japan.

Incumbents
Emperor: Hirohito
Prime Minister: Shigeru Yoshida
Chief Cabinet Secretary: Shigeru Hori until October 30, Taketora Ogata
Chief Justice of the Supreme Court: Kōtarō Tanaka
President of the House of Representatives: Jōji Hayashi until August 1, Banboku Ōno from August 26 to August 28 and from October 24
President of the House of Councillors: Naotake Satō

Governors
Aichi Prefecture: Mikine Kuwahara 
Akita Prefecture: Tokuji Ikeda 
Aomori Prefecture: Bunji Tsushima 
Chiba Prefecture: Hitoshi Shibata 
Ehime Prefecture: Sadatake Hisamatsu 
Fukui Prefecture: Harukazu Obata 
Fukuoka Prefecture: Katsuji Sugimoto 
Fukushima Prefecture: Sakuma Ootake 
Gifu Prefecture: Kamon Muto 
Gunma Prefecture: Yoshio Iyoku (until 4 July); Shigeo Kitano (starting 5 August)
Hiroshima Prefecture: Hiroo Ōhara 
Hokkaido Prefecture: Toshifumi Tanaka
Hyogo Prefecture: Yukio Kishida 
Ibaraki Prefecture: Yoji Tomosue 
Ishikawa Prefecture: Wakio Shibano 
Iwate Prefecture: Kenkichi Kokubun
Kagawa Prefecture: Masanori Kaneko 
Kagoshima Prefecture: Kaku Shigenari 
Kanagawa Prefecture: Iwataro Uchiyama 
Kochi Prefecture: Wakaji Kawamura
Kumamoto Prefecture: Saburō Sakurai 
Kyoto Prefecture: Atsushi Kimura 
Mie Prefecture: Masaru Aoki
Miyagi Prefecture: Kazuji Sasaki (until 4 October); Otogorō Miyagi (starting 5 October)
Miyazaki Prefecture: Tadao Annaka 
Nagano Prefecture: Torao Hayashi 
Nagasaki Prefecture: Takejirō Nishioka 
Nara Prefecture: Ryozo Okuda 
Niigata Prefecture: Shohei Okada 
Oita Prefecture: Tokuju Hosoda 
Okayama Prefecture: Yukiharu Miki 
Osaka Prefecture: Bunzō Akama 
Saga Prefecture: Naotsugu Nabeshima 
Saitama Prefecture: Yuuichi Oosawa
Shiga Prefecture: Iwakichi Hattori 
Shiname Prefecture: Yasuo Tsunematsu 
Shizuoka Prefecture: Toshio Saitō 
Tochigi Prefecture: Goro Abe 
Tokushima Prefecture: Kuniichi Abe 
Tokyo Prefecture: Seiichirō Yasui 
Tottori Prefecture: Aiji Nishio 
Toyama Prefecture: Kunitake Takatsuji 
Wakayama Prefecture: Shinji Ono 
Yamagata Prefecture: Michio Murayama 
Yamaguchi Prefecture: Tatsuo Tanaka 
Yamanashi Prefecture: Hisashi Amano

Events
March 4 – A Richer Scale magnitude 8.1 earthquake with tsunami hit off coast Tokachi region, Hokkaido, according to Japanese government official report, 33 persons were fatalities with 287 persons wounded.
March 6 – The Musashino Bank (武蔵野銀行) was established in Saitama Prefecture. 
March 7 – A Richer Scale magnitude 6.5 earthquake hit off coast Ishikawa Prefecture, seven persons died, eight persons were hurt, according to Japanese government official report.
April 10 – According to Japan Transport Ministry official confirmed report, Japan Airlines Flight 301 crash into Izu Ōshima, all 37 persons and crew were died.
April 17 – According to Japan Fire and Disaster Management Agency official confirmed report, a massive fire in Tottori City, resulting to 160 hectares (395 acres), total 7,240 houses and building damage, kills two persons.
April 28 - Treaty of San Francisco goes into effect, ending the Allied occupation of Japan.
July 18 – A Richer Scale magnitude 7.0 earthquake hit in Takatori, Nara Prefecture, nine persons were fatalities, with 139 persons hurt, according to Japanese government official report.
September 23 – According to Japan Coast Guard official confirmed report, a Kaiyō-maru five entrained by the eruption into Myōjin-shō, all 31 crew were human fatalities. 
October 1 - 1952 Japanese general election

Films
The Flavor of Green Tea over Rice

Births
January 2 - Makoto Nakajima, bureaucrat, Commissioner of the Japan Patent Office
January 17 - Ryuichi Sakamoto, musician, composer, producer and actor (Yellow Magic Orchestra)
January 28 - Tomokazu Miura, actor
February 3 - Miyako Yamaguchi
February 8 - Daisuke Gōri, voice actor (d. 2010)
February 19 – Ryū Murakami, novelist, short story writer, essayist and filmmaker
February 23 – Miyuki Nakajima, singer
March 30 – Kazuyo Saeki, manga artist (d. 2021)
April 10 – Masashi Sada, singer, lyricist, composer, novelist, actor, and a film producer
May 2 – Mari Natsuki, singer, dancer and actress
May 18 - Ryūzaburō Ōtomo, voice actor
June 9 - Yukihiro Takahashi, musician and singer (Yellow Magic Orchestra)
June 20 - Kōichi Mashimo, anime director
July 10 – Yōko Asagami, voice actress 
July 14 – Yutaka Mizutani, actor and singer 
July 15 - Yuriko Koike, politician, cabinet minister and governor of Tokyo.
July 20 - Keiko Matsuzaka, actress
July 2 – Rumiko Koyanagi, actress and singer
November 16 - Shigeru Miyamoto, game designer
December 6 - Shio Satō, Manga artist (d. 2010)
Shinichi Nishimiya, diplomat, designated Ambassador to China in 2012.

Deaths
April 21 - Isamu Yokoyama
August 22 - Hiranuma Kiichirō
October 7 - Keisuke Okada

See also
 List of Japanese films of 1952

References

 
1950s in Japan
Japan
Years of the 20th century in Japan